Hany Mohamed Shaaban Ahmed El Agazy (born 18 January 1985), sometimes spelled El Egeizy, is an Egyptian footballer who plays as a forward.

Club career

Early career
El Agazy is the product of Zamalek's youth department. Since, he could not establish himself in the first team, he moved to Baladeyet El Mahalla. The young striker became one of his new team's stars. He was his club's top scorer in the 2007–08 Egyptian Premier League with 6 goals.

Al Ahly
El Agazy's success at Baladeyet El Mahalla convinced Egypt's giant Al Ahly to sign him. On 25 September 2008, he scored a brace on his debut for his new club 4-0 win against Petrojet in the Egyptian Premier League. He scored the equalizer against Kano Pillars F.C. in the away leg of their 2009 CAF Champions League match. However, El-Agazy struggled to establish himself in Al Ahly's first team. In November 2009, he overcame a pelvic injury and was determined to feature regularly at Al Ahly starting line.

Al Ittihad 
The out-of-favor striker eventually agreed to sign a loan deal with Al Ittihad as part of an exchange deal with Al Ahly. Ittihad received 7 million L.E. in addition to both El Agazy and Ahmed Ali for selling the 2010 Africa Cup of Nations top scorer; Mohamed Nagy "Gedo".

Honours

Al Ahly
 Egyptian Premier League: 2008–09, 2009–10
 CAF Super Cup: 2009.

References

External links
 

1985 births
Living people
People from Damietta Governorate
Egyptian footballers
Association football forwards
Zamalek SC players
Al Ahly SC players
Al Ittihad Alexandria Club players
Smouha SC players
El Entag El Harby SC players
El Raja SC players
Al-Muzahimiyyah Club players
Egyptian Premier League players
Saudi Second Division players
Egyptian expatriate sportspeople in Saudi Arabia
Expatriate footballers in Saudi Arabia